Bhalam was a Village Development Committee, north of Pokhara in the Valam Municipality of Kaski District, situated in the Gandaki Zone of the Western Development Region, located in northern-central Nepal. In 2015, the VDC was amalgamated with Pokhara.

Population
At the time of the 1991 Nepal census Bhalam had a population of 3,658.

Literacy & Education
In 2001, 2300 people were literate, 1024 of them were male and 1276 were female. However, a total of 402 inhabitants could not read or write, including 39 males and 363 females.

There were 721 people in the Valam region eligible for attending school, but only 434 were actually attending schools (291 males and 143 females).

Marital status
According to the 1991 census 2118 people were identified as having a marital status.; 15 of these were identified as being married with more than one spouse (polygamy).

Structure
Like in many other villages of Nepal, the Gurungs live in higher parts of the village (mainly Dadaghau and Bhathal), and the Brahmins and Kshtrees inhabit the lower regions of Valam Phant, Ralichaur and Khora. Some dalits live in both upper and lower parts.

The village still lacks a number of facilities. There are only dirt roads that factually disappear during the monsoon season. As a result, during the monsoon there is no access to the market to sell goods, and no income can be generated during the monsoon from agriculture. As a consequence, large-scale migration to neighbouring cities has taken place and even emigration to foreign countries, leaving the village almost empty.

Culture
Although not generally known for its rich traditions, Bhalam has become known because of its HariHar Cave (Gupha), being a religious site for Hindu. Every year a fair (mela) is held by local youths at the occasion of the Holi (or Phagu Purnima) the 3-day festival of colours. Volleyball competitions are held and dances are performed, attracting citizens in and around Pokhara. Another large event is the annual athletic competition of the British Gurkha recruits each carrying 25 kg of weights to the highest point of the village.

References

External links
UN map of the municipalities of Kaski District

Populated places in Kaski District